Shane Fumani Marhanele (born August 28, 1982), is a South African professional basketball player. He currently plays for Limpopo Pride of the Basketball National League in South Africa.

He represented South Africa's national basketball team at the 2011 FIBA Africa Championship in Antananarivo, Madagascar, where he was his team's top scorer.

References

External links
 FIBA profile
 Afrobasket.com profile
 REAL GM profile

1982 births
Living people
Shooting guards
Small forwards
South African men's basketball players
Sportspeople from Pretoria